The Estonian Social Democratic Youth (colloquially Noorsotsid) is the youth wing organisation of the Social Democratic Party of Estonia. The organisation has been a member of the International Union of Socialist Youth since 1996 and a member of the Young European Socialists since 2001.
The current president is Õnne Paulus and the vice presidents are Robert Kiisler and Andreas Põšnograjev.

History
The party got its name on 3 May 2003. The former name was the Youth Moderates (Noored Mõõdukad) in 1998–2003 when the Estonian Social Democratic Youth Union (Eesti Sotsiaaldemokraatlik Noorteliit) and Young Centrists (Noored Tsentristid) united.  Eesti Sotsiaaldemokraatlik Noorteliit was formed on 12 December 1992 as the youth wing of the Estonian Social Democratic Party. Noored Tsentristid was the youth wing of the Estonian Rural Centre Party (Eesti Maa-Keskerakond). In 2000, the youth wing of the Estonian People's Party (Eesti Rahvaerakond) called Vox was united with the Youth Moderates, since their mother parties had also united.

Presidents
 Ardo Ojasalu (1992–1994)
 Peep Peterson (1994–1998)
 Rene Tammist (1998–2001)
 Jarno Laur (2001–2003)
 Jörgen Siil (2003–2004)
 Randel Länts (2004–2005)
 Gerri Lesk (2005–2006)
 Vallo-Andreas Hallik (2006–2008)
 Kairit Kolsar (Pohla) (2008–2009)
 Heiki Järveveer (2009–2011)
 Lauri Läänemets (2011-2013)
 Elis Tootsman (2013-2014)
 Karl Kirt (2014-2015)
 Maris Sild (2015-2016)
 Monika Maljukov (2016-2018)
 Joosep Vimm (2018-2020)
 Õnne Paulus (2020-2022)
 Eliis Lelov (2022-2022)
 Õnne Paulus (2022-...)

See also
 Politics of Estonia

External links

References

Youth wings of political parties in Estonia
Youth wings of social democratic parties
1992 establishments in Estonia